The 2004–05 season was Ergotelis' 75th season in existence and the club's first season ever in the Greek Alpha Ethniki, later renamed the Superleague Greece. Ergotelis also participated in the Greek cup, entering the competition in the First Round. The content of this article covers club activities from 1 July 2004 until 31 May 2005.

Despite achieving notable victories over traditional Greek giants Olympiacos and PAOK, the team was relegated in the end of the season, finishing in the 15th place.

Players

The following players have departed in mid-season 

Note: Flags indicate national team as has been defined under FIFA eligibility rules. Players and Managers may hold more than one non-FIFA nationality.

Transfers

In

Total spending:  170,000 €

Out
 
Total income:  0.000 €

Expenditure:   170.000 €

Managerial changes

Kit
2004−05

|
|
|
|

Pre-season and friendlies

Pre-season friendlies

Competitions

Overview

Last updated: 24 April 2014

Alpha Ethniki

League table

Results summary

Matches

Greek Cup

First round

|}

Matches

Second round

|}

Matches

Statistics

Goal scorers

Last updated: 25 April 2014

References

Ergotelis
Ergotelis F.C. seasons